Planalto (Portuguese for "plateau") may refer to:

Buildings
 Palácio do Planalto, Brasília, the official seat of the President of Brazil
 The staff and offices of the executive branch of the Brazilian Government, by metonymy

Places
Brazilian Highlands (Planalto Brasileiro), a region covering most of the eastern, southern, and central portions of Brazil
Planalto, Bahia 
Planalto, Paraná 
Planalto, Rio Grande do Sul
Planalto, São Paulo

Other uses
CAP-1 Planalto, a Brazilian trainer aircraft